The sixth season of the television series Buffy the Vampire Slayer premiered on October 2, 2001, with a two-hour premiere on UPN and concluded its 22-episode season with a two-hour finale on May 21, 2002. It maintained its previous timeslot, airing Tuesdays at 8:00 pm ET. This season marked the series' network change from The WB to UPN.

Plot 
After the gang struggle with using the Buffybot to patrol for vampires over the summer, Willow resurrects Buffy with a powerful spell. Although her friends believe that they have taken her out of Hell, Buffy had actually been in Heaven since her death – a fact that she initially only divulges to Spike and later reveals to her friends. She is therefore traumatized by her resurrection and this causes her to fall into a deep depression for most of the season. Dawn is happy to have her sister back, but Buffy's depression causes Dawn's feelings of alienation to lead to kleptomania. 

Giles returns to England after realizing that Buffy has become too reliant on him, while Buffy takes up a fast-food job for money and develops a sexually passionate, but eventually dysfunctional, affair with Spike, who discovers that his chip can no longer harm him when he hits her. For different reasons, Buffy and Spike are both emotionally tormented by the affair, and Buffy hides it from her friends, only confiding to Tara who becomes supportive. Buffy later ends things with Spike, concluding that her using him to deal with her depression is in fact killing her. Tara becomes concerned about Willow's addiction to magic and challenges her to go a week without it, but Willow gives in to her addiction, causing Tara to leave her. Despite their separation, Tara is still devoted to helping Willow with her addiction, leading to their reconciliation.

On the wedding day of Xander and Anya, a magician, seeking his own vengeance against Anya, tricks Xander into calling off the wedding by showing him a false future where they are both miserable. Anya reverts to a vengeance demon once more. When Anya cannot find anyone who wishes vengeance on Xander, and after Buffy has broken up with Spike, Anya and Spike seek solace in a one night stand, making both Buffy and Xander furious at Spike, especially for revealing his affair with Buffy.

The gang also begin to deal with The Trio, a group of nerds led by Warren Mears who use their technological and magical proficiency to attempt to kill or neutralize Buffy and take over Sunnydale, a goal they had in mind since the beginning of the season. The Trio often use monsters such as vampires and demons to assist them. Warren is shown to be the only competent villain of the group, and his capacity for evil is demonstrated by the attempted rape of his ex-girlfriend, which leads to her death. After Buffy thwarts his plans multiple times and the Trio break apart, Warren then attacks Buffy with a gun but accidentally kills Tara with a stray bullet. Willow tries to resurrect Tara but fails.

Tara's death causes Willow to descend into darkness and unleash all of her dark magical powers. Willow hunts down and kills Warren in vengeance. Driven by grief, Willow fights and overpowers Buffy, who is forced to fight when she is unable to condone Willow's actions. Giles returns to help face Willow in battle and infuses her with light magic, tapping into her remaining humanity. This initially backfires when Willow feels the pain in everyone around the world and decides to destroy the world in order to end everyone's suffering. At the climax of the season, Xander prevents Willow from destroying the world by reminding her of their friendship and telling her that he loves her no matter what, the same way Tara did. She eventually breaks down, and the dark magic drains from her. Meanwhile, Buffy comes to terms with being alive again and promises to be there for her sister and friends.

At the end of the season, after attacking and attempting to rape Buffy, a remorseful and traumatized Spike leaves Sunnydale and travels to Africa to see a demon and asks him to "make him to what he used to be" so that he can "give Buffy what she deserves". The audience is led to believe that he was referring to the freedom to be evil (unrestrained by his punishment chip) and thus able to kill Buffy; however, after passing a series of tests, Spike is rewarded with the restoration of his soul.

Cast and characters

Main cast 
 Sarah Michelle Gellar as Buffy Summers
 Nicholas Brendon as Xander Harris
 Emma Caulfield as Anya Jenkins
 Michelle Trachtenberg as Dawn Summers
 Amber Benson as Tara Maclay
 James Marsters as Spike
 Alyson Hannigan as Willow Rosenberg
*  Benson is only credited in the opening credits for one episode, and is credited as a guest star for all her other appearances.

Recurring cast

Guest cast 
 Marc Blucas as Riley Finn
 Dean Butler as Hank Summers
 Kristine Sutherland as Joyce Summers
 Andy Umberger as D'Hoffryn

Crew 
Series creator Joss Whedon served as executive producer, but his role was diminished as he took a hiatus to write the musical episode, and later Fox ordered a new pilot from him, Firefly. Whedon only ended up writing and directing one episode, the musical; this is also the only season where he didn't write and direct the season finale. Marti Noxon was promoted to executive producer and took over the duties of the showrunner and wrote three episodes. David Fury was promoted to co-executive producer and wrote four episodes, directing one of them, as well as writing the season finale. Jane Espenson was promoted to supervising producer and wrote or co-wrote four episodes. Douglas Petrie was promoted to producer, later to supervising producer midseason and wrote or co-wrote three episodes, including directing two of them. Steven S. DeKnight was promoted to story editor and wrote three episodes. Rebecca Rand Kirshner was promoted to story editor and wrote two episodes. New additions in the sixth season included Drew Z. Greenberg who wrote three episodes and Diego Gutierrez, who wrote a freelance episode after previously being an assistant to Whedon.

David Solomon (also producer) directed the highest number of episodes in the sixth season, directing five episodes. James A. Contner (also co-producer) and David Grossman each directed three.

Episodes

Crossovers with Angel 
The sixth season of Buffy the Vampire Slayer coincided with the third season of Angel. With this season, Buffy switched networks from The WB to UPN, while Angel still remained on The WB. Because they were on competing networks, there were no official crossovers. At the time, WB Entertainment President Jordan Levin stated "There will be no crossovers between Angel and Buffy. I think it's more important, in the long term, that Angel really establishes itself as a world that obviously comes from the same mythology, but operates with its own set of principles, guidelines and characters, and really establishes itself independently from Buffy." Although there are no distinct crossovers where characters appear on the other shows, there are moments where characters are mentioned or interactions between the two series' characters occur off screen.

At the end of the Angel episode "Carpe Noctem", Angel (David Boreanaz) receives a telephone call in which Willow tells him Buffy is alive. Buffy then receives a call from Angel at the end of "Flooded", and immediately leaves to meet with him. Although the phone call scenes happen on screen, neither Willow's side on Angel nor Angel's side on Buffy is shown. The scene between Buffy and Angel also happens off screen, but is described by them in the following episodes.

Due to the crossover embargo, this is the only season of Buffy in which Angel does not appear.

Reception 
The series received four Primetime Emmy Award nominations, for Outstanding Hairstyling for a Series, Outstanding Makeup for a Series (Non-Prosthetic), and Outstanding Makeup for a Series (Prosthetic) for "Hell's Bells"; and Outstanding Music Direction for "Once More, with Feeling".

Sarah Michelle Gellar, Alyson Hannigan, James Marsters, and Emma Caulfield were nominated for Satellite Awards for their performances.

The cast won a Special Achievement Award for Outstanding Television Ensemble at the Satellite Awards. The Futon Critic named "Life Serial" the 15th best episode of 2001, "Once More, with Feeling" the 3rd best episode of 2001 and "Normal Again" the 35th best episode of 2002.

The sixth season averaged 4.6 million viewers, slightly higher than the third season of Angel. 

Based on 21 reviews, Rotten Tomatoes gave season six a score of 67% with an average rating of 8.30 out of 10. The website's critics consensus states, "Buffy gets an A for effort, but a bleaker tone and some jarring plot twists make this penultimate season a series low."

"Once More, with Feeling"
"Once More, with Feeling" was nominated for a Hugo Award for Best Dramatic Presentation and for a Nebula Award for Best Script.

"Once More, with Feeling" received positive praise from media and critics when it aired, during overseas syndication, and in reminiscences of the best episodes of Buffy after the series ended. Although Salon.com writer Stephanie Zacharek states "(t)he songs were only half-memorable at best, and the singing ability of the show's regular cast ranged only from the fairly good to the not so great", she also asserts that it works "beautifully", paces itself gracefully, and is "clever and affecting". Tony Johnston in the Herald Sun writes that Gellar "struggles on some of her higher notes, but her dance routines are superb, Michelle Trachtenberg's Dawn reveals sensual dance moves way beyond her tender years, and James Marsters' Spike evokes a sort of Billy Idol yell to disguise his lack of vocal proficiency [...] The rest of the cast mix and match like ready-made Broadway troupers." Johnston counts "I'll Never Tell" as one of the episode's "standout moments". Connie Ogle in The Miami Herald calls the songs "better and far more clever than most of the ones you'll hear on Broadway these days".

Writers agree that the episode was risky and could have failed spectacularly. Jonathan Bernstein in the British newspaper The Observer writes "What could have been, at best, an eccentric diversion and, at worst, a shuddering embarrassment, succeeded on every level [...] It provided a startling demonstration that creator Joss Whedon has a facility with lyrics and melody equal to the one he's demonstrated for the past six seasons with dialogue, character and plot twists. Rather than adopt the 'Hey, wouldn't it be wacky if we suddenly burst into song?' approach practiced by Ally McBeal, the Buffy musical was entirely organic to the series' labyrinthine progression." Steve Murray in The Atlanta Journal-Constitution characterizes the episode as "scary in a brand-new way", saying "Once More, with Feeling" is "as impressive as Whedon's milestone episodes 'Hush' and 'The Body; the episode is "often hilarious", according to Murray, and acts as "(b)oth spoof and homage, [parodying] the hokiness of musicals while also capturing the guilty pleasure and surges of feeling the genre inspires".

Scott Feschuk in Canada's National Post states that the episode "conveyed the same sense of rampant, runaway genius—the rare fusion of artful storytelling and ardent entertainment, a production capable of moving viewers to tears or to an awestruck rapture". Writing in the Toronto Star, Vinay Menon calls "Once More, with Feeling" "dazzling" and writes of "Joss Whedon's inimitable genius"; he goes on to say "(f)or a show that already violates conventions and morphs between genres, its allegorical narrative zigging and zagging seamlessly across chatty comedy, drama and over-the-top horror, 'Once More, with Feeling' is a towering achievement [...] The show may be anchored by existential weightiness, it may be painted with broad, supernatural brushstrokes, but in the end, this coming-of-age story, filled with angst and alienation, is more real than any other so-called teen drama [...] So let's add another line of gushing praise: 'Once More, with Feeling' is rhapsodic, original, deeply affecting, and ultimately, transcendental. Quite simply, television at its best."

Criticism
Season six of Buffy the Vampire Slayer is the most controversial amongst its ardent fandom because it was dramatically darker in tone than previous seasons; it has been called the show's "most hated season". Syfy Wire stated that the show's sixth season "has always been a thorn in its fandom's side. It was a little darker, a little meaner, and a little too different from what came before for the entrenched base to accept." 

Joanna Robinson of Vanity Fair wrote on the 20th anniversary of the show's premiere that season 6, "a dark, unpopular chapter in the show's seven-year run...once its most hated - has become its most important." Robinson praised the introduction of the Evil Trio, the much-maligned "Big Bad" villains for season 6, as presaging the later trend of "entitled, misogynistic rhetoric that rose to the surface during the Gamergate culture wars of 2014, and has seemingly infiltrated everything since—the 2016 presidential election included." She concluded, positively, that "It may lack some of the trademark zip of the show in its prime, and critics of the Dark Willow storyline, in particular, are not wrong in their concerns. But with the luxury of historical context, Season 6 of Buffy carries more powerful resonance than any other moment in the show's history."

About the season's criticism, Joss Whedon says: "I love season 6. It’s really important. But it was a very stark thing to do. It wasn’t just putting Buffy in a very bad, abusive, weird relationship, it was some sort of an end to magic. For me because childhood is so rich with metaphor, a lot of it had to do with leaving that behind. Instead of a bigger than life villain, we had the nerd troika. Instead of drinking blood and doing spells as a sexual metaphor, we had sex. Things became very literal and they lost some of their loveliness. I still think that a lot of the best episodes we ever did were in season 6. I don’t agree with the detractors, but I understand it."

Acting as showrunner for season 6, Marti Noxon received the brunt of fan criticism, eventually stating in 2018 that she felt parts of season 6 "went too far." She elaborated that "We pushed into some categories that almost felt sadistic and that Buffy was volunteering for things that were beyond just “bad choices” and were almost irresponsible for the character. That may have to do with my own history...And I think that killing Tara was — in retrospect, of all the people, did she have to die?" She explained her rationale for taking Buffy in a darker direction, stating that "...I was really vocal about wanting Buffy to make some bad mistakes. My argument was that, when we become young women, especially if we're troubled or haunted by something, that can lead us to make some bad choices, especially in the area of romance."

DVD release 
Buffy the Vampire Slayer: The Complete Sixth Season was released on DVD in region 1 on May 25, 2004 on in region 2 on May 12, 2003. The DVD includes all 22 episodes on 6 discs presented in full frame 1.33:1 aspect ratio (region 1) and in anamorphic widescreen 1.78:1 aspect ratio (region 2 and 4); "Once More, with Feeling" is presented in letterbox widescreen on the region 1 release. Special features on the DVD include six commentary tracks—"Bargaining (Parts 1 & 2)" by writers Marti Noxon and David Fury; "Once More, with Feeling" by writer and director Joss Whedon; "Smashed" by writer Drew Z. Greenberg; "Hell's Bells" by writer Rebecca Rand Kirshner and director David Solomon; and "Grave" by writer David Fury and director James A. Contner. Episode-specific featurettes include a 30-minute documentary on the musical episode as well as karaoke music videos for several musical numbers. "Buffy Gets a Job" features several of the cast and crew members discussing their first jobs and dream jobs. Other featurettes include, the Academy of Television Arts & Sciences Panel Discussion with cast and crew members; "Buffy the Vampire Slayer: Television with a Bite", a 43-minute A&E Network documentary from their Biography series that details its popularity and critical reception with interviews with cast and crew members; and "Life is the Big Bad – Season Six Overview", a 30-minute featurette where cast and crew members discuss the season. Also included are series outtakes and DVD-ROM content.

References

External links 
 
 List of Buffy the Vampire Slayer season 6 episodes at BuffyGuide.com
 

 
2001 American television seasons
2002 American television seasons